Carlos Alberto Navarrete Cáceres (born January 29, 1931 in Quetzaltenango, Guatemala) is an anthropologist and writer. He studied history and literature at the Universidad de San Carlos de Guatemala and received his doctorate in anthropology from the National Autonomous University of Mexico. He is the author of books on anthropology and the 2002 collection of annotated essays entitled Luis Cardoza y Aragón y el Grupo Saker-Ti, that deals with the work of Luis Cardoza y Aragón and his participation in a round table organized by the Grupo Saker-Ti.

Carlos Navarrete Cáceres was awarded the 2005 Guatemala National Prize in Literature for his body of writings.

Published works

External links
Carlos Navarrete on the Guatemalan Literature Webpage

1931 births
People from Quetzaltenango
Guatemalan anthropologists
Anthropology writers
National Autonomous University of Mexico alumni
Living people
Guatemalan essayists
Guatemalan male writers
Male essayists
Universidad de San Carlos de Guatemala alumni